McKenzie Bridge is an unincorporated community in Lane County, Oregon, United States, on the McKenzie River and within Willamette National Forest.

McKenzie Bridge was the home of the National Register of Historic Places listed Log Cabin Inn until March 29, 2006, when it was destroyed by fire. Some historic auxiliary buildings remain.

The McKenzie River Ranger Station,
originally the site of the 1934 Civilian Conservation Corps Camp Belknap, is located in McKenzie Bridge. Jennie B. Harris county park is nearby.

Climate
This region experiences warm (but not hot) and dry summers, with no average monthly temperatures above .  According to the Köppen Climate Classification system, McKenzie Bridge has a warm-summer Mediterranean climate, abbreviated "Csb" on climate maps.

References

External links 

McKenzie River Reflections newspaper
Historic photos of McKenzie Bridge from Salem Public Library
Civilian Conservation Corps Camp Belknap History

Civilian Conservation Corps in Oregon
Unincorporated communities in Lane County, Oregon
Unincorporated communities in Oregon